The 2020 Lucas Oil Late Model Dirt Series was the 15th season of the Lucas Oil Late Model Dirt Series, a national touring series for dirt late models owned & operated by Lucas Oil. The series began with the Super Bowl of Racing at Golden Isles Speedway on February 1, and ended with the Dirt Track World Championship at Portsmouth Raceway Park on October 17. Jimmy Owens won the 2020 drivers' championship. Tanner English was crowned 2020 Rookie of the Year.

Teams and drivers

Complete schedule

Schedule and results

The 2020 schedule was released on October 19, 2019.

Schedule notes and changes
 On March 16, the LOLMDS suspended racing for 30 days in response to the COVID-19 pandemic. As a result, the Buckeye Spring 50 at Atomic Speedway in Chillicothe, Ohio was rescheduled to May 8; the Indiana Icebreaker at Brownstown Speedway in Brownstown, Indiana was rescheduled for May 9; the Tennessee's Action Track 50 at 411 Motor Speedway in Seymour, Tennessee was reschedule for June 26; and the E-Z GO 50 at Talladega Short Track in Eastaboga, Alabama was rescheduled for June 27.
 On April 3, the LOLMDS announced additional schedule changes in response to the COVID-19 pandemic. The Nininger Tribute scheduled for April 17 at Hagerstown Speedway in Hagerstown, Maryland, the Budweiser 50 scheduled for April 24 at Tri-City Speedway in Granite City, Illinois and an April 25 race at Macon Speedway in Illinois were all canceled. Also, the Rumble by the River scheduled for April 19 at Port Royal Speedway in Port Royal, Pennsylvania was postponed to August 27.
 On April 15, the LOLMDS announced that the John Bradshaw Memorial scheduled for May 1 at Ponderosa Speedway in Junction City, Kentucky was postponed to September 4. Also, the Ralph Latham Memorial scheduled for May 2 at Florence Speedway in Union, Kentucky was rescheduled to August 12.
 On May 1, the LOLMDS announced a slate of cancelations, as well as a fanless "Reopening Tour" for the month of May.
 On May 10, the LOLMDS canceled its scheduled Reopening Tour dates for May 11–13 at Lucas Oil Speedway in Wheatland, Missouri due to unfavorable weather forecasts. The tour added dates at Golden Isles Speedway and East Bay Raceway Park.
 On July 1, the LOLMDS canceled events scheduled in Minnesota for July 9 at the Deer Creek Speedway and July 10–11 at the Jackson Motorplex due to COVID-19 restrictions. The series also announced replacement race dates for July 10–11 at Florence Speedway in Union, Kentucky.
 On August 26, the LOLMDS announced the cancelation of the Lucas Oil Late Model Knoxville Nationals at Knoxville Raceway in Knoxville, Iowa and the Kokomo Late Model Shootout at the Kokomo Speedway in Kokomo, Indiana due to COVID-19 restrictions. The LOLMDS announced replacement events at I-80 Speedway in Greenwood, Nebraska on September 17–18 and at Brownstown Speedway in Brownstown, Indiana on September 25.
 On September 30, the LOLMDS announced that the Great Lakes 50 scheduled to run at Raceway 7 was canceled due to a rainy forecast.
 On October 7, the LOLMDS announced that races schedule at Dixie Speedway and Rome Speedway in Georgia were canceled due to Hurricane Delta.

References

Lucas Oil Late Model Dirt Series